Errol Refos (born 19 March 1970) is a Dutch footballer who played as a defender for Eredivisie club Feyenoord during the 1992-1995 football seasons.

References

1970 births
Living people
Dutch footballers
Excelsior Rotterdam players
FC Dordrecht players
Feyenoord players
FC Utrecht players
SC Telstar players
Wuppertaler SV players
Eredivisie players
Surinamese emigrants to the Netherlands
Sportspeople from Paramaribo
Association football defenders
Dutch expatriate footballers
Expatriate footballers in Germany
Dutch expatriate sportspeople in Germany
Netherlands under-21 international footballers